Ernest Gross (22 December 1902 – 8 December 1986) was a French footballer. He played in five matches for the France national football team in 1924 and 1925.

References

External links
 

1902 births
1986 deaths
French footballers
France international footballers
Footballers from Strasbourg
Association football forwards
Footballers at the 1924 Summer Olympics
Olympic footballers of France